Tomasz Jerzy Vetulani (born 21 December 1965) is a Polish painter, drawer and sculptor. Born and educated in Kraków, he moved to Utrecht in 1991, and he has been active there since, holding also a citizenship of the Netherlands. In his works, using among others silicone and sponge, he includes both personal references and comments on current political and social issues.

Life and work 
He was born in 1965 in Kraków as the second son of Jerzy Vetulani and Maria née Pająk, younger brother of Marek. He was baptized by bishop Karol Wojtyła, who was a friend of his family.

He attended the August Witkowski High School, where he passed matura. He studied at the Jan Matejko Academy of Fine Arts, at the Faculty of Painting (1986–1991), and graduated from the studio held by professor Juliusz Joniak. During the studies he shortly collaborated with a renowned artist Tadeusz Kantor. In 1990 he went to Israel for two semesters to study at the University of Haifa. In 1992–1993 he studied at the Academy of Fine Arts in Ghent, holding a scholarship from the Flemish Community of Belgium and the Minister of Culture of Poland.

In Poland, Vetulani made his debut in 1992 with a group exhibition at the Stawski Gallery in Kraków. In 1994 he was among the awarded at the 31st National Painting Exhibition Bielska Jesień organised by Galeria BWA, and in 2002 he was nominated for the Daniel Chodowiecki Award for Polish drawing and graphic art.

In 1991 he moved to Utrecht, Netherlands, where he has since been living and working. In Utrecht, he was commissioned to design several sculptures in public space, including the balustrade of the bridge over the canal between Bleyenburgstraat and Huizingalaan called Eendjesbrug (The Duck Bridge, 2014) and the sculpture titled De Stoel (The Chair) at the Voorveldse Polder Park (2018).

His works have been shown at several dozen individual and collective exhibitions in Poland, the Netherlands, Germany and Norway, including at the Ujazdów Castle Centre for Contemporary Art in Warsaw, Museum of Contemporary Art in Kraków, Galeria BWA in Bielsko-Biała, and in private galleries. Since 2014, he exhibits at the Galeria Olympia in Kraków.

The critics of Tomasz Vetulani's work noticed that “the artist juggles with ease and defiance with various means of expression and media” creating critical works with "strong social and political connotations”, “mocking and ironic character”, in which he looks at Poland “with great concern (...) from the perspective of an emigrant, from the differently shaped, both culturally and socially, Netherlands, which has become his new homeland”, yet on the other hand he creates “subtle images-objects”, showing mostly a female figure, in which he “deliberately rejects the classic beauty of a figure in favor of fragility, transience or simply greater sensitivity to what is present”.

In his painting, among other techniques, Vetulani often uses sketch and watercolour, he works with oil paint and silicone, sometimes adding old photographs to paintings and collages. Interviewed in 1998, he said that he likes working on sponge “because it's a simple, light material and always ready to use. The colour and texture meet my aesthetic requirements and it has a lot of volume and physically, is very present in the space. The ink or paint is immediately absorbed into the foam surface, making any corrections almost impossible. It is a material which lends itself to quick, fast application and is particularly good for spontaneous sketching with paint squeezed directly from the tube. The fact that these works will not last (sponge is not a very durable material) does not deter me; it suits the character of the work very well and to an extent reflects my ideas about art”. He is inspired, among others, by religious architecture and the surrounding Dutch nature and landscape.

He has three children and declares as an atheist.

Selected shows 

Individual shows
 1994: Moira, Utrecht
 1996: Sluijmer & Van Leeuwen, Utrecht
 1997: Hordaland Kunstnersentrum, Bergen
 1999: Galleri Allmenningen, Bergen
 2000: Galerie De Verrasing, Utrecht
 2001: Expositieruimte Stichting 1/2, Rotterdam
 2001: INTERDRUCK Schipper+Patitz, Lipsk
 2003: Galerie Besselaar, Utrecht
 2005: EM Galerie, Kollum
 2009: Solo tentoonstelling Windesheim, Zwolle
 2011: Galeria Aneks, Opole
 2013: Galerie Niek Waterbolk, Utrecht
 2014: Site inspection, Galeria Olympia, Kraków
 2017: (Re)search: schetsen en sculpturen, Museum Warsenhoeck, Nieuwegein
 2017: There is no threat. Weapons and colour, Galeria Olympia, Kraków
 2020: Art in a time of the Plague, Galerie Niek Waterbolk, Utrecht

Group shows
 1992: Stawski Gallery, Kraków
 1994: Galeria BWA, Bielsko-Biała
 1995: Krąg, Bunkier Sztuki, Kraków
 1997: Krajobraz końca XX wieku, Bielska Jesień
 1998: At the time of writing, the Center for Contemporary Art Ujazdowski Castle, Warszawa
 1999: Galerie de Verrasing, Utrecht
 2002: BWA Sopot, Daniel Chodowiecki/Gunther Grass Graphics Competition, Sopot
 2003: Deutsches Textil Museum, “Kirche und Design”, Krefeld
 2005: ART Poznań, Poznań
 2016: Galerie Regio Art Rijnmond, Spijkenisse
 2018: Juliusz Joniak and his students, Studio 124, Palace of Art in Kraków
 2018: Multi-Kulti, Dom Norymberski in Kraków
 2018: Regaining dignity. Poland is a dream, Galeria Olympia, Kraków
 2020: Artists from Krakow: The Generation 1950–1969, MOCAK Museum of Contemporary Art in Kraków

Source

Family

References 

20th-century Polish painters
20th-century Polish male artists
21st-century Polish painters
21st-century male artists
20th-century Polish sculptors
Polish male sculptors
21st-century Polish sculptors
20th-century Dutch painters
21st-century Dutch painters
20th-century Dutch sculptors
21st-century Dutch sculptors
Dutch male painters
Dutch male sculptors
Polish people of Italian descent
Polish emigrants to the Netherlands
Jan Matejko Academy of Fine Arts alumni
1965 births
Artists from Kraków
Living people
Polish male painters
20th-century Dutch male artists